Racer 75 is a wooden racing roller coaster at Kings Dominion in Doswell, Virginia. Designed by John C. Allen, the ride opened with the park in 1975 as Rebel Yell. It features a similar track layout to The Racer (1972) at Kings Island and the now-defunct Thunder Road at Carowinds (1976). In 2018, Rebel Yell was renamed Racer 75, dropping its Confederate theme to represent its racing layout and opening year, as well as a subtle nod to the American Coaster Enthusiasts (ACE) organization that was founded in 1978.

History 
Racer 75 opened as Rebel Yell with Kings Dominion's grand opening in 1975. The original name paid homage to the battle cry used by Confederate soldiers during the Civil War. Shortly after its debut, the racing roller coaster was prominently featured in the 1977 film Rollercoaster. In 1992, the trains on one side were changed to face and run backwards, which was a similar change made on Kings Island's The Racer a decade earlier in 1982. Locals would call this reversed version of the ride the “Yell Rebel”. Both were restored to their original configurations in 2008, not long after Cedar Fair purchased the chain of parks from Paramount. For the park's 40th anniversary in 2014, the trains were repainted red or blue to represent their original color scheme and chasing lights were added back to the water park side of the track.

The Confederate theme was dropped in 2018 when it was renamed Racer 75. The new name was labeled an amalgam that mixes references to the coaster's racing configuration, the year it opened and the ACE acronym for American Coaster Enthusiasts – a club organization that traces its founding back to a 1977 riding event at the park involving Rebel Yell. While the park didn't acknowledge the reason, the name change coincided with rumblings in the state legislature surrounding the removal of Confederate statuary icons throughout Virginia.

Design
Racer 75 features a racing roller coaster layout with two individual tracks that are mirror images of one another. Its design was inspired by the Racer at sister park Kings Island, which opened three years earlier in 1972. The primary difference between the two, is that the tracks on the original Racer split at the fourth hill on the outbound journey, whereas the tracks on Racer 75 do not split until the trains begin the turnaround. Racer 75's design was also utilized in the construction of defunct Thunder Road at Carowinds in 1976, which featured the greatest height and speed of the three until its permanent closure in 2015. The tracks ran parallel to Lake Charles, a large man-made lake on the northwest corner of Kings Dominion. Two-thirds of the lake was drained in the early 1990s during construction of Anaconda.

There is one red and one blue train on each side for a total of two trains on each side. When only running one train on each side, an effort is made to run a train of each color. Racer 75 received the Coaster Landmark award from ACE on June 20, 2003.

See also 
 The Racer, a roller coaster at Kings Island with a similar layout
 Thunder Road, a defunct roller coaster at Carowinds with a similar layout
 Removal of Confederate monuments and memorials

References

External links
Official Racer 75 page

Roller coasters in Virginia
Roller coasters introduced in 1975
Roller coasters operated by Cedar Fair